Beneath the Moon is the debut EP by Cult of Jester, released in 1997 by Flaming Fish. All songs with the exception of "Silent" appeared on Cult of Jester's 1998 debut album Funkatron. The album contains none of the tracks from Cult of Jester's two prior demo tapes.

Track listing

Personnel
Adapted from the Winky Dink and You liner notes.

Cult of Jester
 Ed Finkler – vocals, instruments, arrangements

Release history

References

External links 
 
 Winky Dink and You at Discogs (list of releases)

1997 debut EPs
Cult of Jester albums